The Newfoundland Mountains are a  long mountain range located in southern Box Elder County, Utah, United States. The range is the only 'island' mountain range encircled by the Great Salt Lake Desert salt flat. Other ranges protrude into the desert salt flat, the Silver Island and Dugway Ranges being the premiere examples. Other individual mountains also arise as 'island' peaks, or mountains in the salt flat desert itself, most notably Granite Mountain in the south desert, and Wildcat Mountain to its north. Granite Mountain lies at the north of the Dugway Range.

Description

The northeast end of the range is a wider section, with the range's highest peak southerly (at the north section). The range is made of one ridgeline, and gets progressively lower in elevation, especially at the very south. 
The highpoint of the range is Desert Peak, . The southern tip of the range lies on the north perimeter of the Utah Test and Training Range. Only one major peak is named in the range, Desert Peak (not to be confused with Deseret Peak or the Desert Peak Formation).

Other ranges located on the perimeter of the Great Salt Lake Desert are: Pilot Range, Silver Island Range, Deep Creek Range, Fish Springs Range, Dugway Range, Cedar Mountains, Grassy Mountains, Lakeside Mountains, Hogup Mountains, and Grouse Creek Mountains; some other, much shorter series of hills/'mountains' exist on the desert's perimeter, and include a group on an alluvial fan region south of the Grouse Creek Mountains, the closest to the Newfoundland range.

Access
The closest access to the range is to the north from the Hogup Mountains.

An unimproved road encircles the Newfoundland Mountains foothills at the salt flat. The route is 40+ miles long. (The southern  stretch of the range lies in the Utah Test and Training Range.)

References

External links
 
 Desert Peak, (approx. range center-N to S) (coordinates)

Great Salt Lake Desert
Mountain ranges of Box Elder County, Utah
Mountain ranges of the Great Basin
Mountain ranges of Utah